The Antwerp & District Pipe Band is Belgium's leading pipe band, it's also the first ever grade two band in Belgium which it became after becoming second at the British Championships in Annan.

History
The Antwerp & District Pipe Band is Belgium's leading pipe band. The band was founded in 1978, when a group of enthousistic musicians wanted to achieve a higher musical level and left the Red Hackle Pipe Band Belgium to start a competition-oriented band.
In the first years of its existence the band was led by pipe major Ludo Thijssen and leading drummer Peter Vandeperre. In 1980, only two years after the foundation, the first successes came with a 4th place at one of the world's biggest pipe band championships, the Cowal Highland Gathering. As a result, the band was promoted to grade 3. In the next thirty years, the band played at a top grade 3 level.

In 1988, the band started competing with two bands (a grade 3 and a grade 4 band), to improve the musical level. Andrew Tierney led the B-band to the top of grade 4 (Nowadays it is known as the Belgian Blend Pipe Band, and was recently promoted to grade 3b). In 1990, Andrew took over from Ludo Thijssen and became pipe major of the Antwerp & District Pipe Band until 2002, leaving the band in the hands of Thomas Kerkhof. 
Between 1999 and 2003, the band changed its name to Mühl Pipes & Drums and wore the Rangers FC tartan. These changes were a result of a sponsorship from the German company Mühl.

In 2009, the band felt it was time for another make-over, and swapped its distinctive blue Rangers kilt for the one they still wear today: Cameron of Erracht.

In 2010, the band (under musical direction of pipe major Stephen Tierney and leading drummer Jan de Beuckelaer), achieved a second place at the British Championships in Annan, Scotland. After thirty years in grade three (and later 3A), the band was once more promoted, this time to grade 2.

Band Members 2014
The members travel many miles for band practice and competitions. The Antwerp & District Pipe Band is also a very international band, with players from the Netherlands, Scotland, Canada, Germany and France. Some of the members have also played in various grade 1 bands or left the band to play with them.

Pipers: 
 Peter Hyndrikx (Pipe Major)
 Thomas Kerkhof (Pipe Sergeant)
 Marco De Clercq
 Ruben De Clercq
 Johan De Meulenaere
 Jimmy Devolder
 Lennerd Dubois
 Steff Geerts
 Christian Grammel
 Jan Guretzke
 Michel Lavolé
 Thijs Martens
 Ann Margaret McCuaig
 Dries Papen
 Maggy Schmitz
 Kurt Somers
 Andrew Tierney
 Gert-Jan Van Achterbergh
 Caroline Van Geeteruyen
 Dennis Van Meel
 Stijn Van Wesepoel

Drummers:
 Jan De Beuckelaer (Leading Drummer)
 Marc Blockx
 Sara De Meulemeester
 Sietse Gorisssen
 Marcel Herrmann
 Carel Ooms
 Jan-Philipp Stolz
 Job Van Duijnhoven
 Seppe Verwimp
 Mario	Bronius (bass)
 Willy	Papen (bass)
 Jörg Bleidt (tenor)
 Carina Bleidt (tenor)
 Vicki Bronius (tenor)
 Frauke Dubois (tenor)
 Nils Duchene (tenor)
 Jan Martens (tenor)
 Sebastian Renner (tenor)
 Anse Rubbens (tenor)
 Dimitri Van Bogaert (tenor)

Drone tuner:
 Frank Dubois

Pipe Majors

Notable former members
 Ludo Thijssen: founding pipe-major of the band.
 Olav Goud: moved to Scotland to play with the Polkemmet Pipe Band, the Lothian & Borders Police Pipe Band, the Strathclyde Police Pipe Band, and the Boghall and Bathgate Caledonia Pipe Band.
 René Frederiksen: played with the 6-times world champions, the Simon Fraser University Pipe Band.
 Robbert Van Gorp: played with the Lothian & Borders Police Pipe Band and is a now a member of the Boghall and Bathgate Caledonia Pipe Band.
 Thomas Kerkhof: played with the old Dysart and Dundonald Pipe Band before he became pipe major of the band. After a couple of years, Thomas started practising with the Shotts and Dykehead Pipe Band.

External links

 Official Site
 Facebook Fan Page

Grade 2 pipe bands
Belgian artist groups and collectives
Belgian musicians
Musical groups established in 1978
1978 establishments in Belgium